Refuge de l'Arpont is a refuge in the Alps.The original structure was built in 1969, but large-scale renovations on it began in late 2012, costing 2 540 000 €. The hut is located north of Val-Cenis, near the ruisseau de l'Île (lit. stream of the island).

References

Mountain huts in the Alps
Mountain huts in France